Sürmeli Ali Pasha ( 1645 – 29 May 1695) was an Ottoman statesman who served as  grand vizier of the Ottoman Empire from 1694 to 1695. His epithet sürmeli literally means "wearing mascara" in Turkish.

Ali was born in Didymoteicho (today in East Macedonia and Thrace, northeastern Greece). He was a high-ranking bureaucrat, serving in the shipyards and in the treasury. He also served as the governor of Cyprus and Tripoli Eyalet (modern-day Tripoli, Lebanon).

On 13 March 1694, he was appointed as the grand vizier by sultan Ahmed II. He also took the title serdar, meaning the "commander of the army," and fought against Habsburg monarchy. He laid siege to Petrovaradin (in modern-day Serbia), but soon lifted it.

On 6 February 1695, Ahmed II died, and after some hesitation, the new sultan Mustafa II dismissed Sürmeli Ali Pasha on 22 April 1695. There were several reasons for this. Mustafa suspected that Sürmeli Ali Pasha's candidate for the throne instead of him had been a younger prince and he further suspected that Sürmeli Ali Pasha was against his plan for commanding the army personally. Additionally, there was a power struggle between Sürmeli Ali Pasha and Feyzullah Efendi, the sultan's advisor (and later Shaykh al-Islām). Sürmeli Ali was accused of fraud and exiled to Çeşme (in modern-day İzmir Province, Turkey), but soon the sultan changed his mind and had Sürmeli Ali executed on 29 May 1695.

See also
 List of Ottoman Grand Viziers

References

17th-century Grand Viziers of the Ottoman Empire
Ottoman people of the Great Turkish War
People from Didymoteicho
Executed people from the Ottoman Empire
17th-century executions by the Ottoman Empire
1695 deaths
Year of birth uncertain
Ottoman governors of Cyprus
Ottoman governors of Tripoli, Lebanon